Events from the year 1858 in Denmark.

Incumbents
 Monarch – Frederick VII
 Prime minister – Carl Christian Hall

Events
 10 November – The Danish Order of Freemasons is founded.
 10 September – The statue of Frederick VI is unveiled at Frederiksberg Runddel.
 1 November  The new and taller Skagen Lighthouse is inaugurated as a replacement of the old Skagen Lighthouse from 1747.
 18 November – The Institut Sankt Joseph is founded.

Undated
 Bernhard Hertz establishes his own workshop.
 The Institute for the Blind (founded in 1811) is taken over by the state and continued as the Rotal Institute for the Blind.

Births
 12 January – Viggo Lindstrøm, actor and theatre director (died 1926)
 6 March – Gustav Wied, writer (died 1914)
 25 March – Charlotte Eilersgaard, author and editor (died 1922)
 17 July – Kristine Marie Jensen, cookbook writer (died 1923)
 27 October – Prince Valdemar of Denmark (died 1939)

Deaths
 19 March – Carl Emil Moltke, diplomat and landowner (born 1773)
 10 November – Johannes Theodorus Suhr,  businessman (born 1792)

References

 
1850s in Denmark
Denmark
Years of the 19th century in Denmark